William Dowling  (1825 – 17 February 1887), born in Thomastown, County Kilkenny, was an Irish recipient of the Victoria Cross, the highest and most prestigious award for gallantry in the face of the enemy that can be awarded to British and Commonwealth forces.

Details
Dowling was approximately 32 years old and a private in the 32nd Regiment of Foot (later the Duke of Cornwall's Light Infantry), British Army during the Indian Mutiny when he was awarded the VC for the following deeds during the Siege of Lucknow:

He was later promoted to sergeant and died in Liverpool, 17 February 1887.

The Medal
His Victoria Cross is displayed at the Duke of Cornwall's Light Infantry Museum in Bodmin, Cornwall.

References

Listed in order of publication year 
 The Register of the Victoria Cross (1981, 1988 and 1997)
 
 Ireland's VCs - (Dept of Economic Development 1995)
 Monuments to Courage (David Harvey, 1999)
 Irish Winners of the Victoria Cross (Richard Doherty & David Truesdale, 2000)
 Liverpool VCs (James Murphy, Pen and Sword Books, 2008)

External links
 Location of grave and VC medal (Liverpool)

1825 births
1887 deaths
19th-century Irish people
Irish soldiers in the British Army
People from Thomastown
Duke of Cornwall's Light Infantry soldiers
Irish recipients of the Victoria Cross
Indian Rebellion of 1857 recipients of the Victoria Cross
British Army recipients of the Victoria Cross